Édgar Iván López Rodríguez (born 21 April 1999), also known as Gacelo, is a Mexican professional footballer who plays as a forward for Liga MX club Toluca.

Career statistics

Club

References

External links

1999 births
Living people
Mexican footballers
Association football forwards
Club Tijuana footballers
Dorados de Sinaloa footballers
Liga MX players
Ascenso MX players
Liga Premier de México players
Tercera División de México players
Sportspeople from Tijuana
Footballers from Baja California